Dr. Kwame Nkrumah was the first Prime Minister and first President of Ghana. Nkrumah had run governments under the supervision of the British government through Charles Arden-Clarke, the Governor-General. His first government under colonial rule started from 21 March 1952 until independence. His first independent government took office on 6 March 1957. From 1 July 1960, Ghana became a republic and Nkrumah became the first president of Ghana.

In February 1966 his government was overthrown by the National Liberation Council military coup.

Nkrumah's independence government (1957 – 1960)

Nkrumah's republican government (1960 – 1966)
Ghana became a republic on 1 July 1960. A referendum in February 1964 on Ghana becoming a one-party state resulted in a landslide victory for the Kwame Nkrumah and the CPP government. There were hardly any votes against the one-party state in all the regions. A year later in June 1965, all 198 candidates of the CPP for parliament were elected unopposed. In February 1965, Nkrumah reshuffled made a big change to his government. Twelve new ministers were appointed and many others changed portfolios.

See also
Convention People's Party

References

External links
Picture: 1957 Govt. of Ghana

Ministries of Elizabeth II
Nkrumaism
Governments of Ghana
Politics of Ghana
History of Ghana
Kwame Nkrumah
1966 in Ghana
1957 establishments in Ghana
1966 disestablishments in Ghana
Lists of government ministers of Ghana